Freescale Semiconductor, Inc. was an American semiconductor manufacturer. It was created by the divestiture of the Semiconductor Products Sector of Motorola in 2004.  Freescale focused their integrated circuit products on the automotive, embedded and communications markets. It was bought by a private investor group in 2006, and subsequently merged into NXP Semiconductors in 2015.

History
As of 2003, Motorola Semiconductor Products Sector earned US$5.0 billion in semiconductor sales in 2002 (out of US$27 billion sales for all of Motorola).

Motorola announced that their semiconductor division would be divested on October 6, 2003, to create Freescale. Freescale completed its Initial public offering (IPO) on July 16, 2004, at a price of US$13. In its announcement, it estimated the stock price to be US$17.50- 19.50 but following a cooling of the market towards tech stocks, it lowered its price to US$13. Existing shareholders of Motorola stock received 0.110415 shares of Freescale stock for every share of Motorola stock as a dividend which was distributed on December 2, 2004.

Buyout 
On September 15, 2006, Freescale agreed to accept a buyout for the sum of $17.6 billion ($40 per share) by a consortium led by the Blackstone Group. Share prices of $13 at the July 2004 IPO had risen to $39.35 in afterhours trading that Friday when the news, rumored that week, broke. A special shareholders meeting on November 13, 2006, voted to accept the buyout offer. The purchase, which closed on December 1, 2006, is reportedly the largest private buyout of a technology company and one of the ten largest buyouts of all time.

Freescale filed to go public again on February 11, 2011, and completed its IPO on May 26, 2011. Freescale was traded on the New York Stock Exchange under the ticker symbol FSL. At the time of the IPO, the company had $7.6 billion in outstanding debt on its books, and the company was investigated for misconduct related to this IPO.

On March 8, 2014, Freescale announced that 20 of its employees were lost aboard Malaysia Airlines Flight 370.

Products

Automotive 
MSG (Micro-controller Solutions Group) is the largest business unit within Freescale and is currently the largest semiconductor supplier to the automotive industry. Modern cars use electronics to manage the engine for peak performance and to reduce emissions, and Freescale is the largest supplier of engine system microcontrollers in the world. Automotive safety systems such as anti-lock brakes and airbags also use microcontrollers and analog power management circuits from Freescale. Freescale also produces a range of integrated sensor products such as accelerometers and pressure sensors.

Freescale's SMARTMOS analog portfolio provides power actuation and multiple switch detect interface family ICs and system basis chips for hybrid vehicles.

In November 2008 Freescale announced that the company would collaborate with McLaren Electronic Systems to further develop its KERS system for McLaren's Formula One car from 2010 onwards. Both parties believed this collaboration would improve McLaren's KERS system and help the system filter down to road car technology.

Other business units 
Besides MSG business group, Freescale other major semiconductor businesses are the NMG (Networking and Multimedia Group) as well as RASG (RF, Analog and Sensors Group). Freescale, under the guidance of IBM, had also been a source of PowerPC microprocessors (ICs) for Apple Computer's PowerBooks and Mac mini products until the Mac transition to Intel processors in 2006. They joined Power.org in 2006 as a founding member to develop and promote the use of Power Architecture.

DragonBall is a low power derivation of the earlier Motorola 68000 family microprocessors. Freescale also has a portfolio of Digital Signal Processor (DSP) products based on StarCore Technology. Freescale's DSPs are being used in Broadband Wireless, Voice Over IP and video infrastructure systems.

Litigation 
Freescale was sued by Marvell Semiconductor for infringing seven patents. The case was settled in 2015.

Freescale lost a patent infringement lawsuit filed by Tessera Corporation and was forced to pay an undisclosed amount as part of the settlement.

Merger
A merger agreement with NXP Semiconductors was announced in March 2015, to form a  billion company. The acquisition closed on December 7, 2015.

See also
ON Semiconductor, another Motorola semiconductor spinoff
List of Freescale products

References

External links
2015 Archive of Corporate website

The Blackstone Group companies
Freescale Semiconductor
Motorola
American companies established in 2004
American companies disestablished in 2015
Computer companies established in 2004
Computer companies disestablished in 2015
Electronics companies established in 2004
Electronics companies disestablished in 2015
Manufacturing companies based in Austin, Texas
Auto parts suppliers
NXP Semiconductors
Semiconductor companies of the United States
Defunct companies based in Texas
Corporate spin-offs
2015 mergers and acquisitions
Defunct computer companies of the United States
Defunct computer hardware companies